Michael Werner may refer to:

 Michael Werner (footballer) (born 1969), former Australian rules footballer
 Michael Werner (publisher) (born 1965), founder of a Pennsylvania German newspaper
 Michael J. Werner, American film producer
  (born 1939), German art dealer, founder of the Galerie Michael Werner in Cologne